is a Japanese politician of the Constitutional Democratic Party and a member of the House of Representatives in the Diet (national legislature). A native of Yokohama in Kanagawa Prefecture and 1977 graduate of International Christian University, she had served in the assembly of Tokyo for three terms (10 years) since 1993. She was a member of the House of Councillors between 2007 and 2013.

References

External links 
 Official website in Japanese.

1953 births
Living people
People from Yokohama
Female members of the House of Representatives (Japan)
Female members of the House of Councillors (Japan)
Members of the House of Representatives (Japan)
Members of the House of Councillors (Japan)
Members of the Tokyo Metropolitan Assembly
Constitutional Democratic Party of Japan politicians
Democratic Party of Japan politicians
21st-century Japanese politicians
21st-century Japanese women politicians